Peasmarsh is a village and civil parish in the Rother district, in the county of East Sussex in England.

The village church, dedicated to St Peter and Paul, lies about one mile (1.6 km) from the village; it is thought the village centre was moved after the Black Death plague. There are three public houses and a motel in close proximity to the village; and a country house hotel with a leisure centre. The village is also home to an independent supermarket, although the proprietors choose not to open their store on Sundays. Peasmarsh Place, now a residential care home, is to the south-east of the village.

Every year, in June, the Peasmarsh Chamber Music Festival, bringing world-class concerts of chamber music, is held in the church.

Governance
The lowest level of government is the Peasmarsh parish council. The parish council is responsible for local amenities such as the provision of litter bins, bus shelters and allotments. They also provide a voice into the district council meetings. The parish council comprises nine councillors with elections being held every four years. The May 2007 election was uncontested.

Rother District council provides the next level of government with services such as refuse collection, planning consent, leisure amenities and council tax collection. Peasmarsh lies within the Rother Levels ward, which provides two councillors. The May 2007 election returned two Conservatives councillors.

East Sussex county council is the third tier of government, providing education, libraries and highway maintenance. Peasmarsh falls within the Northern Rother ward. Peter Jones, Conservative, was elected in the May 2005 election with 49.7% of the vote.

The UK Parliament constituency for Peasmarsh is Bexhill and Battle. Gregory Barker was re-elected in the May 2005 election, and the current Member of Parliament is Huw Merriman, a member of the Conservative Party.

Prior to Brexit in 2020, Peasmarsh was part of the South East England constituency in the European Parliament.

Notable residents (past & present)

Sir Paul McCartney MBE, musician and former member of The Beatles, lives in a farmhouse in the village.
Rudi Martinus van Dijk, international composer buried at the church of St. Peter and St. Paul, Peasmarsh
Anthony Roland, art collector and producer of films on art.
Maria Ann Smith (née Sherwood, d. 9 March 1870), from whom comes the name of the Granny Smith apple, was born here in 1799.
Henry Crockford, son of the gambler William Crockford, lived at Flackley Ash (now a hotel) in the village
Anthony Marwood MBE, British violinist, lives in a cottage in the rural countryside.

References

External links

 Peasmarsh Parish Council - http://www.peasmarsh.org.uk
 Peasmarsh Chamber Music Festival - http://www.peasmarshfestival.co.uk/

 
Villages in East Sussex
Civil parishes in East Sussex
Rother District